Huoyan Mountain is a mountain located at the border of Sanyi and Yuanli Townships in Miaoli County, Taiwan. The mountain is known for its jagged exposed laterite surfaces that look like fire.

Description 
Huoyan Mountain is located on the north bank of Da'an River. Geologically, it is part of the Toukeshan Formation (頭嵙山層), a Pleistocene-era formation. The prominent red cliffs on the mountain are due to the tectonic uplift, weak shear strength of the underlying soil, and heavy rainfall. The mountain is protected by the Forestry Bureau to preserve the unique landscape and ecology.

County Highway 140, a major road connecting the coastal regions with the mountainous interior in Miaoli County, passes on the south side of the mountain. In the past, the highway would often be blocked by landslides triggered by heavy rainfall. Therefore, in 2006, a tunnel was built to protect the road from blockages.

Hiking 
There are a couple of hiking trails that reach the triangulation point at the summit of Huoyan Mountain. The north peak, slightly higher in elevation, is not reachable by the trails. The mountain is one of the "hundred little mountains" (臺灣小百岳), a list of shorter and accessible mountains promoted by the Sports Administration for recreation.

Gallery

See also 
 Huoyan Mountain Ecology Museum
 Jiujiufeng

References 

Mountains of Taiwan
Landforms of Miaoli County
Mountaineering in Taiwan